Adon P. Brown (October 12, 1873 – April 22, 1942) was an American lawyer and politician from New York.

Life
He was the son of Henry Brown (1830–1888) and Jennie L. (White) Brown.

He practiced law in Leonardsville.

Brown was a member of the New York State Senate from 1917 to 1920, sitting in the 140th, 141st (both 37th D.), 142nd and 143rd New York State Legislatures (both 39th D.); and was Chairman of the Committee on Agriculture in 1920.

He died on April 22, 1942, in Tampa, Florida; and was buried at the Leonardsville Cemetery.

New York Solicitor General Wendell P. Brown (c.1884–1966) was his brother.

Sources
 STATE MILK CONTROL BILL INTRODUCED in NYT on January 29, 1920
 DOWNING THREATENS TO CHASTISE BROWN in NYT on April 3, 1920
 ADON P. BROWN; Ex-State Senator at Albany Dies at 68 in Tampa, Fla. in NYT on April 24, 1942 (subscription required)
 WENDELL BROWN, STATE AIDE, DEAD, his brother's obit, in NYT on March 1, 1966 (subscription required)

External links

1873 births
1942 deaths
Republican Party New York (state) state senators
People from Brookfield, New York